Sump'n Else was an American live teen dance television show that aired from 1965 to 1968 on Channel8 WFAA-TV in Dallas, Texas, formatted similarly to American Bandstand.

Hosts 

The show featuring a youthful host, Ron Chapman, who went on to local fame as the long-time morning host of KVIL 103.7 FM and often co-hosted by Ralph Baker, Jr. who was a local television and radio commercial announcer. Ralph was also known as The Sanger-Harris Man because he was a fashion model for the Sanger-Harris department store. He hosted the Sanger-Harris fashion segment on the Sump'n Else show. He was also a KLIF-AM announcer at the time. Ralph also discovered Little Group member Calleen Anderegg and auditioned her at WFAA on The Group and Chapman Show.

National performers 

The show featured nationally known guest performers, including The Monkees, Herman's Hermits, Paul Revere and the Raiders, The Rose Garden, 13th Floor Elevators, Sonny and Cher, The Outsiders and Frank Zappa.

Dancers 

Sump'n Else also featured go-go dancers, students from local high schools known as "The Little Group". The original four included Joanie Prather (Janet on Eight is Enough), Calleen Anderegg (Miss Dallas 1966), Delpha Teague, and Kathy Forney. The second "Little Group" included Cheryl Lovett, Martha Latimer, Becky Ballard, Melody Coleman and Pat Osborne.

Local performers 

The Sump'n Else show featured local bands including The Five Americans, The Novas, The Menerals, Those Guys, Kenny and the Kasuals, The Briks, Mouse and the Traps, Kit and the Outlaws, Johnathan's Experiences, The Dancing Bear, The Chaparrals, The Glad Ones, Living End, Redcoats, Tracers, The Outcasts and The Visions.

Popularity 

Sump'n Else was an afternoon staple on Channel8, attracting high school students from throughout North Texas. The program broadcast live from a NorthPark Center storefront studio which featured a soundproof window. When major acts appeared, police officers were located both inside and outside the mall directing traffic and handling the large crowds. A youth-oriented clothing store called Pois'n Ivy opened next to the studio and advertised on the show, capitalizing on the program's local popularity.

Psychedelia 

On December 7, 1967, an episode of Sump'n Else called "LSD: Insight or Insanity?" featured psychedelic props and techniques along with a public service documentary. On January 22, 1968, the show broadcast a special episode called the "Psychedelic Light Show"; the set had been redesigned to feature lighting that changed with the music.

Aftermath 

The final broadcast of Sump'n Else was on January 26, 1968. WFAA put the afternoon Dialing for Dollars program on in the afternoon and showed a movie after the game show. Ron Chapman joined the team of KVIL-FM and later was teamed up with Suzie Humphreys who also hosted a popular WFAA morning program. Chapman was at KVIL-FM from 1968-2000. In 2000 he joined sister station KLUV-FM which is an oldies station. (Ironically, Chapman's final home at KLUV 98.7 FM once was the sister FM station to his original home at KLIF-AM. It originally was licensed as KLIF-FM and simulcasted KLIF-AM programming from 1963 - 1966. In 1966 it was re-licensed as KNUS and operated separately from KLIF-AM. In the early 1980s, after a series of ownership changes, KNUS became KLUV and adopted a rock-oldies format.) Christopher Haze was a Drive-time DJ for KNUS and was seen on the Sump'n Else show as a co-host as well. Ron Chapman retired from full-time broadcasting in the summer of 2005, but continued to be featured as a television/radio pitchman for many years thereafter prior to his death in April 2021. Calleen Anderegg also worked briefly in the production team of KVIL-FM with Ron Chapman. Ralph Baker, Jr. still remained in the Dallas-Fort Worth broadcast market and continued to be heard as a commercial announcer on KLIF-AM and television commercials on WFAA and many of the other DFW television and radio stations.

Reunion 

The 20th Anniversary Reunion Episode, hosted by Ron Chapman, was broadcast live from the Galleria Dallas shopping mall in Dallas on Sept. 7, 1985, in a simulcast with Channel8 WFAA-TV and KVIL-FM. Ralph Baker, Jr. both "Little Groups" and recurring substitute members, and Kenny and the Kasuals were on this episode.

References

External links 
 http://www.dallasnews.com/sharedcontent/dws/ent/stories/DN-nipples_13gl.ART.State.Edition2.4263f47.html
 http://www.dallashistory.org/cgi-bin/webbbs_config.pl?noframes;read=36998
 http://www.dragonstreet.com/novas.html
 http://home.online.no/~frodebye/bugs_henderson/cd_mouse_traps.htm
 http://www.wfaa.com/about/about2.html
 https://www.facebook.com/billinthe60s
 http://www.cicadelic.com/livinliner.htm 
 http://www.dragonstreet.com/aboutus.html 
 AllMusic 
 http://members.shaw.ca/fz-pomd/giglist/1966.html 
 AllMusic 
 http://globalia.net/donlope/fz/videography/1965-69.html 
 http://www.rimpo.de/justusfive.html 
 Kenny and The Kasuals
 http://www.guitarmasta.net/1/13th_floor_elevators/

1965 American television series debuts
1968 American television series endings
Local music television shows in the United States
Culture of Dallas